Dreifaltigkeitskirche (German for Trinity Church) may refer to:

Austria
 Church of the Holy Trinity, Salzburg in Salzburg

Australia
 Lutheran Trinity Church, East Melbourne, a German-language church known as Deutsche Evangelische Dreifaltigkeitskirche

Germany
Dreifaltigkeitskirche (Berlin)
Dresden Cathedral, or the Cathedral of the Holy Trinity, previously the Catholic Church of the Royal Court of Saxony
Trinitatiskirche (Dresden), in ruins
Dreifaltigkeitskirche (Munich)
 Dreifaltigkeitskirche (Speyer)

Switzerland
 Dreifaltigkeitskirche, Bern, from 1899

See also
Holy Trinity Church (disambiguation)
Trinity Church (disambiguation)